Queen Best Kemigisa Akiiki (born 1967) is the Queen Mother of the Tooro Kingdom, based in Fort Portal city, Uganda. She is mother to Rukirabasaija Oyo Nyimba Kabamba Iguru Amooti Rukidi IV, the reigning Omukama of Tooro.

Early life
She is the daughter of Prince (Omubiito) Mujungu, of the Batuku clan, of Rwebisengo in Present day Ntoroko district. At the time of her birth, Ntoroko was a county of Kabarole district before curving it around 1974 into Bundibugyo district alongside Bwamba County. She was educated at Kahinju Primary School, Mpanga Senior Secondary School and Kyebambe Girls School, all in Fort Portal city, Tooro Kingdom. She is the Founder and Patron of the Tooro Women's Development Association and a co-founder of the African Queens and Women Cultural Leaders Network.
Queen Best Kemigisa is a passionate about issues that affect girls and women in Africa. She organises Hakyooto events in various parts of Africa to education, entertain and empower people so that they are able to live their best lives.

Queen Mother
Queen Best Akiiki was widowed on 3 August 1995 when King Patrick Olimi Kaboyo II died suddenly. She was one of the guardians of her son, the new King and one of a team of regents who helped rule Tooro until he reached his majority in 2010.

Her daughter, Omubiitokati (Princess) Ruth Nsemere Komuntale, was married to African-American businessman Christopher Thomas, but they have since divorced.

Controversies
Queen Best took part in the controversial Kings and Sultans of Africa Forum set up by the then Libyan leader, Muammar Gaddafi.

She allegedly evicted 60-year-old John Businge from disputed land with the support of armed members of the King's security force.

Queen Best brought charges of fraud against a man accused of stealing around $60,000 US from her, money supposed to be used to register her Toro Women's Organisation with the United Nations. Moses Kyeyune was convicted in May 2013 and sentenced to five years in prison.

She was also involved in a legal fight with a lawyer, Bob Kasango who she claimed had defrauded her of a large sum of money.

References

External links
 Official website of Queen of Tooro
 Official website of Tooro Kingdom

Living people
1967 births
Ugandan traditional rulers and monarchs
Women rulers in Africa